The Lanyang River is a river in northeast Taiwan.

Geology
The river flows through Yilan County for 73 kilometers. It has a drainage basin area of 978 km2 with maximum peak flow of 5,420 m3/s.

See also
List of rivers in Taiwan

References

Rivers of Taiwan
Landforms of Yilan County, Taiwan